List or Liste is a European surname. Notable people with the surname include:

List
 Benjamin List  (born 1968), German chemist who won the 2021 Nobel Prize in Chemistry with David MacMillan
 Friedrich List (1789–1846), German economist
 Garrett List (1943–2019), American trombonist
 Guido von List (1848–1919), Austrian/German writer and occultist 
 Helmut List (born 1941), Austrian engineer and philanthropist
 John List (1925–2008), American murderer
 Liesbeth List (1941–2020), Dutch singer
 Luke List, multiple people
 Maximilian List (1910–c.1980), German SS concentration camp commandant 
 Paul List (1887–1954), British-based Russian Jewish chess player
 Peyton List, multiple people
 Wilhelm List (1880–1971), German WW2 field marshal

Liste
 Betty Liste (born 1958), American jazz pianist

Counts of Alba de Liste
 Enrique Enríquez de Mendoza, 1st count of Alba de Liste, title granted by Henry IV of Castile in 1459
 Diego Enríquez de Guzmán (~1530–1604), 5th count of Alba de Liste
 Luis Enríquez de Guzmán, 9th Count of Alba de Liste (~1605–1661)
 Diego Pacheco Téllez-Girón Gómez de Sandoval (1754–1811), 18th count of Alba de Liste

See also
 Liszt (disambiguation)

Surnames